The 1886 New York state election was held on November 2, 1886, to elect a judge of the New York Court of Appeals, as well as all members of the New York State Assembly.

History
In 1880, there was only one state officer to be elected statewide: a judge of the Court of Appeals, to succeed Theodore Miller who had reached the constitutional age limit of 70 years.

The Republican State Committee met on September 29 at the Gilsey House in New York City. Charles Daniels was nominated for the Court of Appeals.

The Democratic State Committee met on September 29 at Hoffman House in New York City. Charles C. B. Walker was Chairman. Rufus W. Peckham was nominated for the Court of Appeals by acclamation.

Result
The Democratic judge was elected in a tight race, with a plurality of less than 8,000 votes. Only in New York City, Peckham had a majority of over 53,000 votes, thus swamping the solid Republican upstate majority.

See also
New York state elections

References
Notes

Sources
Result in Albany County: QUEER ELECTION RESULTS; ...ALBANY COUNTY'S VOTE in NYT on November 11, 1886 [gives erroneously "McFarland" as the fourth candidate]
Result in New York City: THE VOTES IN THE CITY in NYT on November 14, 1886
Result: The Tribune Almanac 1887
CONFIDENT MR. GEORGE in NYT on October 1, 1886 (mentioning McParlin's nomination)

1886
1886 New York (state) elections